Witch hazel (Hamamelis) is a genus of flowering shrubs.

Witch hazel may also refer to:

Witch hazel (astringent), an astringent topical medicine derived from the Hamamelis plant
Witch Hazel (Disney), a Disney cartoon and comics character
Witch Hazel (Looney Tunes), a Looney Tunes cartoon character
Witch Hazel, Oregon, United States, an unincorporated community
Buttercup witch hazel, Corylopsis pauciflora, a spring-flowering shrub

See also
Witchazel, an album by Matt Berry